Saint Gregory of Nyssa was a church and monastery of Trabzon. It's believed the church was built around 1280-1297 by the wife of John III, Emperor of Trabzon. After 1665, St Gregory became the cathedral of the city of Trabzon.  The church is dedicated to Saint Gregory of Nyssa (c. 330–395), a Christian bishop and saint. Nyssa (current day Nevşehir) is a city located in Cappadocia. Georgian traveler Timote Gabashvili visited the church in the late 1750s and included this event in his writings. In 1863, the Metropolitan Constantius of Trabzon rebuilt the church.

In 1930 the church was dynamited to make way for the City Club.

Notes

External links
Saint Gregory of Nyssa Church, Trebizond

Byzantine architecture in Trabzon
Byzantine church buildings in Turkey
Empire of Trebizond
13th-century Eastern Orthodox church buildings
Destroyed churches in Turkey